Trescore may refer to:

 Trescore Balneario, town and comune in the Province of Bergamo, Lombardy, northern Italy
 Trescore Cremasco, comune in the province of Cremona in the Italian region Lombardy, northern Italy